Kenneth, Ken or Kenny King may refer to:

Ken King
 Ken King (born 1971), American politician and businessman
 Ken King (ice hockey) (1952–2020), Canadian sports executive

Kenneth King
 Kenneth George King or Jonathan King (born 1944), English singer-songwriter
 Kenneth King (academic) (born 1940), British historian and Africanist
 Kenneth King (artist), Irish artist
 Kenneth King (cricketer) (1915-1997), English cricketer
 Kenneth King (dancer) (born 1948), American post-modern dancer and choreographer
 Kenneth King (Kansas politician) (1930-2003), American politician and member of the Kansas House of Representatives

Kenny King
 Kenny King (defensive lineman) (born 1981), American football defensive tackle
 Kenny King (running back) (born 1957), American football running back
 Kenny King (wrestler) (born 1981), American professional wrestler